Allan MacDonald (1853 – 8 December 1898) was an Australian politician.

MacDonald was born in Adelaide in 1853. In 1893 he was elected to the Tasmanian House of Assembly, representing the seat of North Launceston. He served until his defeat in 1897. He died in 1898 in Launceston.

References

1853 births
1898 deaths
Members of the Tasmanian House of Assembly